Charles Stewart Bradley (born 1919) is a South African-born former international lawn bowler who competed for Rhodesia.

Bowls career
Bradley won a bronze medal at the 1958 British Empire and Commonwealth Games in Cardiff in the fours with Alex Pascoe, Basil Wells and Ronnie Turner. Four years later he won a second bronze in the pairs competition at the 1962 Commonwealth Games with Bill Jackson.

Personal life
His son Alan Bradley was also Rhodesian international bowler. He was a farmer by trade.

References

1919 births
Possibly living people
South African emigrants to Rhodesia
Zimbabwean male bowls players
Bowls players at the 1958 British Empire and Commonwealth Games
Bowls players at the 1962 British Empire and Commonwealth Games
Commonwealth Games bronze medallists for Southern Rhodesia
Commonwealth Games bronze medallists for Rhodesia and Nyasaland
Commonwealth Games medallists in lawn bowls
Medallists at the 1958 British Empire and Commonwealth Games
Medallists at the 1962 British Empire and Commonwealth Games